Cobo may refer to:
 Cobo Center, a convention center in Detroit, Michigan, US
 Alfredo Vásquez Cobo International Airport, an airport in Leticia, Colombia
 Villar del Cobo, a municipality in Aragon, Spain
 Cobo, a village and beach in Castel, Guernsey

Notable people with surname Cobo or Cobos
 Albert Cobo, former Mayor of Detroit
 Anthony Cobos, politician from the state of Texas
 Bernabé Cobo (1582-1657), missionary and historian of the Inca Empire  
 Carlos de los Cobos, Mexican football coach and former player
 Carola Cobo (1909–2003), Bolivian theater and radio artist
 Fernando "Cobo" Pereira, major in the military of São Tomé and Príncipe
 Francisco de los Cobos y Molina (1477–1547), Secretary of State of Charles V, Holy Roman Emperor.
 Ignacio Cobos, Spanish former field hockey player
 Jesús López Cobos, Spanish conductor
 José Cobos (footballer), French former football player
 Juan Fernando Cobo, Colombian painter, illustrator, sculptor and cultural promoter
 Juan José Cobo, Spanish road racing cyclist
 Julio Cobos, Argentine politician and Vice President 
 Leila Cobo, author and Executive Director, Latin Content & Programming at Billboard
 Mario Rodríguez Cobos, Argentine writer
 Ricardo Cobo, Colombian classical guitar player
 Rosa Cobo Bedía (born 1956), Spanish feminist, writer, and professor
 Yohana Cobo, Spanish film and television actress

Spanish toponymic surnames